Taipo River may refer to:

 Taipō River (Buller District), New Zealand
 Taipo River (Westland District), New Zealand

See also
 Taipa River, New Zealand
 Tai Po River, Hong Kong